Ether cleavage refers to chemical substitution reactions that lead to the cleavage of ethers. Due to the high chemical stability of ethers, the cleavage of the C-O bond is uncommon in the absence of specialized reagents or under extreme conditions.

In organic chemistry, ether cleavage is an acid catalyzed nucleophilic substitution reaction. Depending on the specific ether, cleavage can follow either SN1 or SN2 mechanisms. Distinguishing between both mechanisms requires consideration of inductive and mesomeric effects that could stabilize or destabilize a potential carbocation in the SN1 pathway. Usage of hydrohalic acids takes advantage of the fact that these agents are able to protonate the ether oxygen atom and also provide a halide anion as a suitable nucleophile. However, as ethers show similar basicity as alcohols (pKa of approximately 16), the equilibrium of protonation lies on the side of the unprotonated ether and cleavage is usually very slow at room temperature.

Ethers can be cleaved by strongly basic agents, e.g. organolithium compounds. Cyclic ethers are especially susceptible to cleavage, but acyclic ethers can be cleaved as well.

SN1 Ether cleavage 

The unimolecular SN1 mechanism proceeds via a carbocation (provided that the carbocation can be adequately stabilized). In the example, the oxygen atom in methyl tert-butyl ether is reversibly protonated. The resulting oxonium ion then decomposes into methanol and a relatively stable tert-butyl cation. The latter is then attacked by a nucleophile halide (here bromide), yielding tert-butyl bromide.

Mechanism

SN2 ether cleavage 

If the potential carbocation can not be stabilized, ether cleavage follows a bimolecular, concerted SN2 mechanism. In the example, the ether oxygen is reversibly protonated. The halide ion (here bromide) then nucleophilically attacks the sterically less hindered carbon atom, thereby forming methyl bromide and 1-propanol.

Mechanism

Other factors 
SN1 ether cleavage is generally faster than SN2 ether cleavage. However, reactions that would require the formation of unstable carbocations (methyl, vinyl, aryl or primary carbon) proceed via SN2 mechanism. The hydrohalic acid also plays an important role, as the rate of reaction is greater with hydroiodic acid than with hydrobromic acid. Hydrochloric acid only reacts under more rigorous conditions. The reason lies in the higher acidity of the heavier hydrohalic acids as well as the higher nucleophilicity of the respective conjugate base. Fluoride is not nucleophilic enough to allow for usage of hydrofluoric acid to cleave ethers in protic media. Regardless of which hydrohalic acid is used, the rate of reaction is comparably low, so that heating of the reaction mixture is required.

Ether cleavage with organometallic agents

Mechanism 
Basic ether cleavage is induced by deprotonation in α position. The ether then decomposes into an alkene and an alkoxide. Cyclic ethers allow for an especially quick concerted cleavage, as seen for THF:

Deprotonated acyclic ethers perform beta-hydride elimination, forming an olefinic ether. The formed hydride then attacks the olefinic rest in α position to the ether oxygen, releasing the alkoxide.

Impact 
Organometallic agents are often handled in etheric solvents, which coordinate to the metallic centers and thereby enhance the reactivity of the organic rests. Here, the ether cleavage poses a problem, as it does not only decompose the solvent, but also uses up the organometallic agent. Reactions with organometallic agents are therefore typically performed at low temperatures (-78 °C). At these temperatures, deprotonation is kinetically inhibited and slow compared to many reactions that are intended to take place.

Literature 
 Paula Y. Bruice: Organic Chemistry, Prentice Hall. .

References 

Substitution reactions
Chemical processes
Chemical reactions of ethers